Dinenage is a surname. Notable people with the surname include:

 Caroline Dinenage (born 1971), English politician
 Fred Dinenage (born 1942), English television presenter, broadcaster, and author

See also
 Dinnage